The Edward Frisbie Homestead is a historic house at 240 Stony Creek Road in Branford, Connecticut, United States. Built about 1790 by the grandson of one of Branford's first settlers, it is a little-altered and well-preserved example of Federal period architecture.  It was listed on the National Register of Historic Places in 1985.

Description and history
The Edward Frisbie Homestead stands in a rural-suburban area of eastern Branford, on the north side of Stony Creek Road (Connecticut Route 146) just west of its junction with Leete Island Road.  It is a -story wood-frame structure, with a gabled roof, central chimney, and clapboard exterior.  A single-story gabled ell extends to the right side of the south-facing main block.  The main facade is five bays wide, with sash windows arranged symmetrically around the center entrance.  The entrance consists of a six-panel door flanked by paneled pilasters and topped by a corniced entablature.  The interior follows a central chimney plan, and retains a large amount of original woodwork.  Doors and windows are framed with pilasters, and fireplace walls have carved mantels and paneling.

The house was built about 1790 by Edward Frisbie, the grandson of another Edward Frisbie, who was one of the original grantees of land that became Branford.  The house is particularly elegant in comparison to other surviving houses of the time and neighborhood, probably due to Frisbie's success as a smuggler during the American Revolutionary War.  He and his descendants were active in town affairs, and retained ownership of the property until 1870.

See also
National Register of Historic Places listings in New Haven County, Connecticut

References

National Register of Historic Places in New Haven County, Connecticut
Houses on the National Register of Historic Places in Connecticut
Federal architecture in Connecticut
Houses completed in 1790
Houses in Branford, Connecticut